In Greek mythology, Pyracmus was a king of Euboea during the Heroic Age.  After waging war against Boeotia, he was slain by Heracles.

References

Bibliography
 John Bell, Bell's New Pantheon; or, Historical Dictionary of the Gods, Demi-Gods, Heroes, and Fabulous Personages of Antiquity, J. Bell, London (1790).

Kings in Greek mythology
Ancient Euboeans